Me Being Me is a second studio album by American rapper Frayser Boy from Memphis, Tennessee. It was released on July 12, 2005 via Hypnotize Minds with manufacturing and distribution by Asylum. Production of the album was handled by DJ Paul and Juicy J. It features guest appearances from Hypnotize Camp Posse, Paul Wall and Mike Jones.

Track listing

Chart history

References

2005 albums
Frayser Boy albums
Albums produced by DJ Paul
Albums produced by Juicy J